Al Utouriya is a village in Qatar, located in the municipality of Al-Shahaniya. It is connected to both places by road.

It used to be part of the Al Jemailiya municipality before the municipality was incorporated into Al Rayyan. In 2014, the village was incorporated into the newly-created Al-Shahaniya Municipality.

Etymology
Al Utouriya's name is derived from the Arabic word atar, which translates to 'perfume' or 'aroma'. It was given this name due to the scent emanating from a nearby rawdat (depression) which hosts a number of aromatic herbs.

Various alternative transliterations of the name exist, such as Al `Aţūrīyah, Al Atoriya, Al Athārīyah, Latariyah, and Leatooriya.

History

Settlers first came to the region in the 1960s, despite being cut off from many essential services. In the 1980s, the village was connected to Qatar's power grid system. Mixed-use farms comprise the livelihood of some residents, while others commute to the capital Doha and elsewhere for work. As a result of poor living conditions, many of the original residents have migrated to Doha. In 2016, it was estimated that around 500 inhabitants occupied the village, with an overall 47 homes being recorded, all of which are resided in by more than one family.

Infrastructure
The village is primarily rural community centered on agriculture. No health care or educational facilities were recorded in the 2010 census. The village also lacks parks, schools, supermarkets and gas stations. For public services and food items, most residents travel to Al Jemailiya.

Agriculture
An experimental farm was established here by the government in the early 1980s in an initiative to boost food self-sufficiency. The farm's greenhouses successfully extended the growing season of cucumbers, resulting in a yield of 140 kg in 1982, and a pursuance to build similar greenhouses elsewhere in the country. There is a large government-owned plant nursery in the village which covers 2,500 sq meters. Plants from the nursery are used in research and also distributed to government ministries. It was established in 2003. Numerous privately-owned farms have also been established in the area, most of which are mixed-use and grow fodder crops in addition to raising livestock.

References

Populated places in Al-Shahaniya